The Mechanoid Invasion (and its source books, supplements and sequels) was the first role-playing game from Palladium Books, conceived and written by Kevin Siembieda, with contributions from Erick Wujcik.

Concept
The Mechanoid Invasion centered on a powerful, malevolent, and numerous race of bio-driven machines that had come to invade a planet called Gideon E that was colonized by humans.  In its original edition, published in 1981, the game was published as a series of three comic-book sized sourcebooks:

the first, The Mechanoid Invasion, dealt with the eponymous invasion of Gideon E
the second, Journey, dealt with human survivors living within a mechanoid mothership after the destruction of the Gideon E colony and introduced "minor magic and some psionics",
the third, Homeworld, dealt with the Mechanoid homeworld itself.

Legacy
The first book was revised and republished in an expanded form in 1985 as The Mechanoids.

In Spring 1991 Caliber Comics also produced a 3-book series called The Mechanoids which adapted the RPG into comic book stories.

In the early 90s "Sourcebook Two" of Rifts was released, titled The Mechanoids, and it included MDC conversions for the Mechanoids for use in a Rifts Earth setting, along with a storyline on how they got there.

In Winter 1998 a Collected Mechanoids RPG was released, compiled as the Mechanoid Invasion Trilogy which is still available.

Mechanoids Space, a complete RPG first announced in 1993 for release the following year, was last promised for publication in December 2002 as late as September 2002.  it is still available in the store labelled "coming soon".

Reception
William A. Barton reviewed The Mechanoid Invasion in The Space Gamer No. 42. Barton commented that "If you can overlook its amateurish production (and the price helps in this), I think you'll find The Mechanoid Invasion worth the investment. It should provide some enjoyable role playing in an SF setting as a break from Traveller or your other favorite SF RPG."

Review
Different Worlds #31

References

External links
The Mechanoid Invasion official discussion board at Palladium Books Forums of the Megaverse
The Mechanoid Invasion at RPG Geek Database
The Mechanoid Invasion at RPGnet Game Index

Megaverse (Palladium Books)
Role-playing games introduced in 1981
Science fiction role-playing games